Henry Charles Thoroton Hildyard (16 October 1824 – 14 September 1898) was an English first-class cricketer and clergyman.

The son of Colonel Thomas Blackborne Thoroton-Hildyard, he was born in October 1824 at Flintham, Nottinghamshire. He was educated at Eton College, before going up to Merton College, Oxford. While studying at Oxford, he played first-class cricket intermittently for Oxford University between 1843–46, making four appearances, in which he scored 57 runs with a high score of 19. In addition to playing for Oxford University, Hildyard also made a single first-class appearance for the Marylebone Cricket Club against Oxford University in 1844.

After graduating from Oxford, Hildyard took holy orders in the Church of England. He was the rector of Rowley in Yorkshire from 1852 until his death there in September 1898. His brother was the politician Thomas Thoroton-Hildyard.

References

External links

1824 births
1898 deaths
People from Rushcliffe (district)
Cricketers from Nottinghamshire
People educated at Eton College
Alumni of Merton College, Oxford
English cricketers
Oxford University cricketers
Marylebone Cricket Club cricketers
19th-century English Anglican priests
20th-century English Anglican priests